Free is The Party's second studio album. Teddy Riley wrote three songs for the album, including the new jack swing-tinged title song, "Free," which was also remixed by house-music legends Steve "Silk" Hurley and E-Smoove. Dr. Dre produced the song "Let's Get Right Down to It," and the group itself also got involved in the writing and producing of the album, which would once again land it another concert tour opening spot with Color Me Badd, its last special for the Disney Channel, "All About The Party," and an appearance on Blossom. However, the album was not as successful on the charts as previous ones, which prompted Damon Pampolina to leave the group.

Track listing
Free (Teddy Riley, Lavaba Mallison, Jerrold Holmes) - 4:29 - Lead vocals: Chase, Deedee & Damon
Change on Me (Deedee Magno, Tiffini Hale, Andre Williams, Keith Williams, Reggie Turner) - 3:42 - Lead vocals: Deedee
All About Love (Teddy Riley, Omar Chandler, Markell Riley) - 4:40 - Lead vocals: Albert
I Want You (Damon Pampolina, Tiffini Hale, DJ Dino, MC Gizmo, Frankie Z., Freddy Bastone) - 3:40 - Lead vocals: Damon & Deedee
In My Life (Clyde Lieberman, Jeff Pescetto, Richard Burgess) - 4:51 - Lead vocals: Chase & Deedee
Where is My Romeo (Wayne Hammer, Jeff Slater) - 4:32 - Lead vocals: Tiffini
Frontin' (Albert Fields, Damon Pampolina, Andre Cymone, James Brown, John Starks, Fred Wesley, Charles Bobbit) - 4:06 - Lead vocals: Albert, Damon & Deedee 
Let's Get Right Down to It (Dr. Dre, Colin Wolfe) - 3:28 - Lead vocals: Albert & Tiffini
At All Times (Thomas Taliaferro, Teddy Riley) - 4:04 - Lead vocals: Deedee
It's out of My Heart (Michelle Vice, Scott Cutler) - 4:52 - Lead vocals: Damon & Albert
Needin' Someone (Chase Hampton, Cliff Magness) - 4:17 - Lead vocals: Chase
Independent Woman (Romany Malco, Paul Guidry) - 3:50 - Lead vocals: Tiffini
Cappuccino and Bacon (Albert Fields, Tiffini Hale, Chase Hampton, Deedee Magno, Damon Pampolina) - 2:08 - Instrumental
Life Ain't Nothin' But a Party (Albert Fields, Tiffini Hale, Chase Hampton, Deedee Magno, Damon Pampolina, Elliott Wolfe) - Lead vocals: Group
Quien Es Mi Romeo (Spanish version of Where is My Romeo) - Lead vocals: Tiffini

1992 albums
Hollywood Records albums
The Party (band) albums